The Captain and the Kid Tour was a concert tour by Elton John which lasted from September 2006 until January 2008. The tour was to promote the album of the same name.

The tour started on 15 September 2006, in Sacramento, California. The tour covered sixteen states in the United States and eight provinces in Canada. The tour travelled from the United States to Europe and then to South Africa. The tour came to a close in Johannesburg on 19 January 2008.

Background
After the 2006 European tour, John performed more shows in Las Vegas before going back to Europe to perform two shows in Eastern Europe. He then returned to the United States to embark on The Captain & The Kid Tour to promote his new album of the same name.

John returned to Las Vegas for the last time in 2006 to perform eleven Red Piano shows. After these shows, he went back on the road to promote The Captain & The Kid once more, visiting New York City then major cities in Canada. John then returned to Europe to perform two nights in Basel, Switzerland, to perform in the Avo Session Basel in mid-November. John and his band then visited Australia and New Zealand promoting The Captain & The Kid.

After returning to Las Vegas briefly, Elton John and the band travelled to Europe to continue promoting The Captain & The Kid throughout Europe including a solo concert in Madrid. John performed at The Concert for Diana once at the very beginning; he opened the show with a solo performance of "Your Song". John later returned with the rest of his band to close with concert. They played three songs but were originally scheduled to play four, but "Crocodile Rock" was dropped from the setlist because piano complications before John's performance pushed his appearance later into the evening and they could not exceed the sound curfew in place.

These South African shows marked the end of The Captain and the Kid tour in which Elton John had been promoting his latest album The Captain & the Kid.

Tour dates

Festivals and other miscellaneous performances

Box office score data

References

External links

 Information Site with Tour Dates

Elton John concert tours
2006 concert tours
2007 concert tours
2008 concert tours